Milan Řehoř (born June 23, 1984) is a Czech professional ice hockey goaltender.

Řehoř made his Czech Extraliga debut playing with HC Oceláři Třinec during the 2008–09 Czech Extraliga season, playing one game whilst on loan from HC Dukla Jihlava of the 1st Czech Republic Hockey League. He signed for Piráti Chomutov of the 1st League in 2011 and played in the Czech Extraliga with the team the following season following their promotion. He would also play one game for HC Karlovy Vary and BK Mladá Boleslav in separate loan spells. He currently plays for fourth-tier side HHK Velké Meziříčí.

References

External links

1984 births
Living people
Czech ice hockey goaltenders
HC Dukla Jihlava players
HC Karlovy Vary players
BK Mladá Boleslav players
HC Most players
Narvik IK players
HC Oceláři Třinec players
Piráti Chomutov players
HC ZUBR Přerov players
Sportovní Klub Kadaň players
HC Tábor players
People from Žďár nad Sázavou
Sportspeople from the Vysočina Region
Czech expatriate ice hockey people
Expatriate ice hockey players in Norway
Czech expatriate sportspeople in Norway